Viscount is a village in the Canadian province of Saskatchewan within the Rural Municipality of Viscount No. 341 and Census Division No. 11. Viscount is located on Saskatchewan Highway 16, the Yellowhead Highway, in central Saskatchewan east of Colonsay and west of Lanigan.

Viscount post office first opened in 1908 in the Dominion Land Survey Sec.29, Twp.34, R.26, W2.

History 
Viscount incorporated as a village on December 17, 1908.

Demographics 

Climate

See also

List of communities in Saskatchewan
List of rural municipalities in Saskatchewan

References

Villages in Saskatchewan
Division No. 11, Saskatchewan